Idomeni or Eidomene is a small village in Greece, near the border with North Macedonia. The village is located in the municipality of Paeonia, Kilkis regional unit of Central Macedonia (Greece).

The village is built at an elevation of 65 meters, in the outskirts of Kouri hill. It mounts in the west bank of Axios river, close to the border with Republic of North Macedonia. The village is interwoven with a railway station, which is the first railway station that someone meets entering Greece from the north.

History
Eidomene is mentioned by Strabo at his work Geographica and by Thucydides at his work History of the Peloponnesian War.

Before 1926, it was also known as Sehovo or Seovo, and it was renamed in 1936 to the namesake of the ancient Greek town "Idomene", which was mounted near the modern village. During the Greek War of Independence in 1821, the inhabitants of Sechovo/Idomeni (Sechovites) revolted against the Ottoman authorities, under Zafirios Stamatiades, one of the leaders who later fought in southern Greece. The village was destroyed by the Ottoman military authorities in 1824 as a retaliation for the participation in the revolt. From 1870 until the Balkan Wars, a lot of national conflicts between Greeks and Bulgarians took place in the village.  In the book "Ethnographie des Vilayets d'Adrianople, de Monastir et de Salonique", published in Constantinople in 1878, that reflects the statistics of the male population in 1873, Seovo was noted as a village with 85 households and 394 Bulgarian inhabitants. After the Russo-Turkish War (1877–78) the Bulgarian school in Sehovo was closed by Greek metropolitan bishop in Strumica.

At the Revolt of the Macedonian Greeks in 1878 against the Treaty of San Stefano, three people from the village joined armed rebel groups: Dellios Kovatsis, Stogiannis (Stoikos) Stoides and Nicolaos Stoides. During the Greek struggle for Macedonia a lot of inhabitants of Sechovo/Idomeni distinguished for their fighting for the Greek side, such as Georgios Stamatiades, his son Zafirios Stamatiades Papazafiriou, his grandsons Georgios Papazafiriou and Gregorios Papazafiriou, and also Stylianos Kovatsis. On the other hand, а committee of Internal Macedonian Revolutionary Organization (IMRO) was founded in 1895–1896. A lot of inhabitants of Sechovo distinguished for their fighting for the Bulgarian side, such as voyvode of IMRO Argir Manasiev (1872-1932), Dimitar Dzuzdanov (1887-1929), Grigor Totev (1868-1934), Gono Balabanov etc.

The "La Macédoine et sa Population Chrétienne" survey by Dimitar Mishev (D. Brankov) concluded that the Christian population in Sehovo in 1905 was composed of 1120 Bulgarian Exarchists.

Transportation

Rail
Close to Idomeni, there is the Railway Station of Idomeni, with fast trains to Thessaloniki, Belgrade and Central Europe.

Migrants 
Since 2014, immigrants from Syria, as well as Afghanistan, Pakistan and other parts of the Middle East and South Asia began to flock to Idomeni to enter the North Macedonia via the Greek border. As North Macedonia and its northern neighbor Serbia are not in the Schengen Area, some refugees prefer this route to reach countries such as Germany and Sweden. Re-entering the Schengen Area from Serbia may result in arrest and possibly being held in Croatia or Hungary which are closer to their preferred immigration destinations, notably Germany.

In 2015, the North Macedonia began guarding its borders with military force to prevent migrants from entering the country since Serbia too closed its borders.

The transit camp at Idomeni, built in 2015 by Médecins Sans Frontières and the UNHCR to provide basic support for up to 6000 refugees daily, rapidly became a longer-term residential camp. The number of refugees at Idomeni has reached more than 15,000. On 24 May 2016, Greek authorities began relocating refugees from the Idomeni camp to processing facilities in and around Thessaloniki.

References

Greece–North Macedonia border crossings
Populated places in Kilkis (regional unit)